The 1973 European Amateur Team Championship took place 28 June – 1 July at Penina Golf & Resort in Portimão, Algarve, Portugal. It was the eighth men's golf European Amateur Team Championship.

Venue 

The tournament was played at the resort's 18-hole Championship Course, originally called The Penina, founded by John Stilwell and designed by Sir Henry Cotton. The course was set up with par 35 over the first nine holes and par 38 on the second nine, finishing with two par 5 holes.

The whether was warm and sunny during the whole tournament.

Format 
All participating teams played one qualification round of stroke-play with six players, counted the five best scores for each team.

The eight best teams formed flight A, in knock-out match-play over the next three days. The teams were seeded based on their positions after the stroke play. The first placed team were drawn to play the quarter final against the eight placed team, the second against the seventh, the third against the sixth and the fourth against the fifth. In each match between two nation teams, two 18-hole foursome games and five 18-hole single games were played. Teams were allowed to use six players during the team matches, selecting four of them in the morning foursome matches and five players in to the afternoon single matches.

The six teams placed 9–14 in the qualification stroke-play formed Flight B to play similar knock-out play and the four teams placed 15–18 formed Flight C to meet each other, to decide their final positions.

Teams 
18 nation teams contested the event. Each team consisted of six players.

Winners 
Defending champions England won the gold medal, earning their fourth title, beating, just as at the previous event, Scotland in the final, this time with 4–3. Team Sweden, earned the bronze on third place, after beating  Spain 4–3 in the bronze match.

Individual leaders in the opening 18-hole stroke-play qualifying competition was John Davies, England, Yves Hofstetter, Switzerland and Willie Milne, Scotland, tied first, each with a score of 2-under-par 71. There was no official award for the lowest individual scores.

Results 
Qualification round

Team standings

* Note: In the event of a tie the order was determined by the better non-counting score.

Individual leaders

 Note: There was no official award for the lowest individual scores.

Flight A

Bracket

Final games

Flight B

Elimination matches

Match for 13th place

Match for 11th place

Match for 9th place

Flight C

Round 1

Round 2

Round 3

Final standings

Sources:

See also 
 Eisenhower Trophy – biennial world amateur team golf championship for men organized by the International Golf Federation.
 European Ladies' Team Championship – European amateur team golf championship for women organised by the European Golf Association.

References

External links 
European Golf Association: Full results

European Amateur Team Championship
Golf tournaments in Portugal
European Amateur Team Championship
European Amateur Team Championship
European Amateur Team Championship
European Amateur Team Championship